Ahmethan Köse (born 7 January 1997) is a Turkish professional footballer who plays as a midfielder for Adanaspor. 

He is an academy graduate of Fenerbahçe and made his senior debut in July 2017, aged 20. Köse is also a former Turkish youth international and represented his nation from U15 to U19 level.

Club career

Fenerbahçe
Köse is an academy graduate of Fenerbahçe, having joined in 2011 from Kurttepe Spor, and scored 34 goals in 60 matches at across the various youth levels for the club. He made his senior debut for the club on 27 July 2017, starting in a 2–1 Europa League win over Sturm Graz. He made his Süper Lig debut on 12 August, coming on as a second-half substitute for Robin van Persie in a 2–2 draw with Göztepe. He scored his first goal for the club on 29 November, netting in a 6–0 Turkish Cup win over Adana Demirspor.

Loan to Boluspor
On 9 January 2018, second-division side Boluspor confirmed the signing of Köse on loan for the remainder of the season.

Career statistics
 

1 Includes Turkish Cup matches.
2 Includes UEFA Europa League matches.

References

1997 births
Living people
Association football midfielders
Turkish footballers
Turkey youth international footballers
Fenerbahçe S.K. footballers
Boluspor footballers
Kırklarelispor footballers
Samsunspor footballers
Adanaspor footballers
Süper Lig players
TFF First League players
TFF Second League players